Steuben County Jail is a historic jail located at Angola, Steuben County, Indiana. It was built in 1877, and is a -story,  brick and concrete building with Second Empire style design elements.  It consists of an irregular main section with a rectangular prison wing at the rear.  A porch was enclosed in 1961 and wing added in 1971. The main section is topped by a slate mansard roof and has an elaborate tower with a pyramidal roof and elaborate cupola.

It was listed on the National Register of Historic Places in 1976.

References

Jails on the National Register of Historic Places in Indiana
Second Empire architecture in Indiana
Government buildings completed in 1877
Buildings and structures in Steuben County, Indiana
National Register of Historic Places in Steuben County, Indiana
Jails in Indiana
1877 establishments in Indiana